Jarno Parikka (born 21 July 1986) is a retired Finnish footballer who played as a striker.

Parikka was known as a striker who possessed a good footballing brain for bringing his teammates in the game while having an undeniable eye for the goal. His preferred position in the pitch is playing with another striker and lying just behind him. He has been criticized for being somewhat lightweight for a striker.

Biography
Parikka was born and raised in Vantaa. He is a second generation footballer, as his father Jari also played for HJK Helsinki in the 1980s. He played also ice hockey for seven years before moving to HJK and choosing football. He has also played futsal.

Club career
Jarno Parikka got started with football in the age of five, when he joined Korson Palloseura in Vantaa. He joined HJK's youth squad in 2000. He had played as a midfielder for Korso, but was converted from a midfield role to striker in HJK. After three years on the youth team, Parikka made his first appearance for HJK's reserve team Klubi 04 in Kakkonen. His season was successful and for the following season he was promoted to the first team. Unfortunately, he broke his anterior crucial ligament in a pre-season match against FC Inter Turku and lost the whole season 2005.

Parikka made his first appearance for senior side at the age of nineteen, when coach Keith Armstrong let him play in the 1–2 away defeat against FC KooTeePee on 21 April 2006. He succeeded in scoring his first goal on 28 June 2006 in a 3–2 win against TPS.

In 2007, he made seven goals in the Finnish league cup, which is a shared record with Ari Hjelm and Aleksei Kangaskolkka. His final breakthrough came in the season 2008, when he scored 9 league goals. In the 2009 season, he is HJK's vice-captain and a regular in the starting eleven. His former Finland U-17 coach Jyrki Heliskoski has compared him to Raúl González, as he has many similarities with the Spaniard.

On 21 January 2009, Parikka signed a new three-year deal with HJK. On 23 November 2011, after his contract with HJK expired, it was announced that Parikka had signed a 2+1 year-contract with Vaasan Palloseura. He scored his first goal for VPS on 22 April 2012, in a 2−1 home win over newly promoted FC Lahti.

On 16 December 2015, HJK announced the return of Parikka to the club on a one-year contract. Less than two-months later, on 12 February 2016, Parikka announced his retirement from football after a series of knee injuries.

International career
Parikka has played for his country in different national junior teams, most recently the Finland national under-21 football team. In the 2003 FIFA U-17 World Championship he played on the Finnish U-17 team and scored the equalising goal in Finland's 2–1 win against China in the opening fixture.

He was also a part of the Finnish under-21 team, that qualified for the UEFA European Under-21 Football Championship final tournament in 2009.

On 4 February 2009 Parikka made his debut in the Finnish national team in a friendly match against Japan.

Family
Parikka's father Jari is also a footballer who played for also played for HJK. His younger brother Mikko Parikka is a regular cast member of the popular prime time soap opera Salatut elämät.

Career statistics

International

Statistics accurate as of match played 4 February 2009

Honours

Club
HJK
 Veikkausliiga (3): 2009, 2010, 2011
 Finnish Cup (3): 2006, 2008, 2011

Individual

The Most Promising Young Player: 2004

References

External links
 Profile at HJK.fi
 Stats at Veikkausliiga.com
 

1986 births
Living people
Association football forwards
Finnish footballers
Finland international footballers
Finland under-21 international footballers
Helsingin Jalkapalloklubi players
Veikkausliiga players
Sportspeople from Vantaa